WUEO-LD is a low-powered television station licensed to Macon, Georgia, United States. The station, which broadcasts its digital signal on virtual 49 and UHF channel 11, is owned by HC2 Holdings.

History 
The station's construction permit was initially issued on October 17, 2013 under the calls of W49EO-D and changed to WUEO-LD.

Digital channels

References

External links
DTV America

Low-power television stations in the United States
Innovate Corp.
Television stations in Georgia (U.S. state)
Television channels and stations established in 2013
2013 establishments in Georgia (U.S. state)